The 2019 Montana State Bobcats football team represented Montana State University as a member of the Big Sky Conference during the 2019 NCAA Division I FCS football season. Led by fourth-year head coach Jeff Choate, the Bobcats compiled an overall record of 11–4 with a mark of 6–2 in conference play, placing in a three-way tie for third in the Big Sky. Montana State received an at-large bid to the NCAA Division I Football Championship playoffs, where, after a first round bye, they defeated Albany in the second round and Austin Peay in the quarterfinals before losing in the semifinals to the eventual national champion, North Dakota State. The Bobcats played their home games at Bobcat Stadium in Bozeman, Montana.

Previous season

The Bobcats finished the 2018 season 8–5, 5–3 in Big Sky play to finish in a tie for fourth place. They received an at-large bid to the FCS Playoffs where they defeated Incarnate Word in the first round before losing in the second round to North Dakota State.

Preseason

Big Sky preseason poll
The Big Sky released their preseason media and coaches' polls on July 15, 2019. The Bobcats were picked to finish in fourth place by the media, and in fifth place by the coaches.

Preseason All–Big Sky team
The Bobcats had five players selected to the preseason all-Big Sky team.

Offense

Mitch Brott – OL

Troy Andersen – FB

Defense

Bryce Sterk – OLB

Greg Filer – CB

Brayden Konkol – S

Schedule

Game summaries

at Texas Tech

Southeast Missouri State

at Western Illinois

Norfolk State

Northern Arizona

at Cal Poly

Sacramento State

at North Dakota

Southern Utah

at Northern Colorado

at UC Davis

Montana

FCS Playoffs
The Bobcats entered the postseason tournament as the number five seed, with a first-round bye.

Albany–Second Round

Austin Peay–Quarterfinals

at North Dakota State–Semifinals

Ranking movements

References

Montana State
Montana State Bobcats football seasons
Montana State
Montana State Bobcats football